Women Painters of the World, from the time of Caterina Vigri, 1413–1463, to Rosa Bonheur and the present day, assembled and edited by Walter Shaw Sparrow, lists an overview of prominent women painters up to 1905, the year of publication.

The purpose of the book was to prove wrong the statement that "the achievements of women painters have been second-rate." The book includes well over 300 images of paintings by over 200 painters, most of whom were born in the 19th century and won medals at various international exhibitions. The book is a useful reference work for anyone studying women's art of the late 19th century.

List of women in the book

Louise Abbéma
Madame Abran (Marthe Abran, 1866-1908)
Georges Achille-Fould
Helen Allingham
Anna Alma-Tadema
Laura Theresa Alma-Tadema
Sophie Gengembre Anderson
Helen Cordelia Angell
Sofonisba Anguissola
Christine Angus
Berthe Art
Gerardina Jacoba van de Sande Bakhuyzen
Antonia de Bañuelos
Rose Maynard Barton
Marie Bashkirtseff
Jeanna Bauck
Amalie Bauerlë
Mary Beale
Lady Diana Beauclerk
Cecilia Beaux
Ana Bešlić
Marie-Guillemine Benoist
Marie Bilders-van Bosse
Lily Blatherwick
Tina Blau
Nelly Bodenheim
Kossa Bokchan
Rosa Bonheur
Mlle. Bouillier
Madame Bovi
Olga Boznanska
Louise Breslau
Elena Brockmann
Jennie Augusta Brownscombe
Anne Frances Byrne
Katharine Cameron
Margaret Cameron (Mary Margaret Cameron)
Marie Gabrielle Capet
Margaret Sarah Carpenter
Madeleine Carpentier
Rosalba Carriera
Mary Cassatt
Marie Cazin
Francine Charderon
Marian Emma Chase
Zoé-Laure de Chatillon
Jeanne-Elisabeth Chaudet
Lilian Cheviot
Mlle. Claudie
Christabel Cockerell
Marie Amélie Cogniet
Uranie Alphonsine Colin-Libour
Jacqueline Comerre-Paton
Cornelia Conant
Delphine Arnould de Cool-Fortin
Diana Coomans
Maria Cosway
Amelia Curran
Louise Danse
Héléna Arsène Darmesteter
Maria Davids
Césarine Davin-Mirvault
Evelyn De Morgan
Jane Mary Dealy
Virginie Demont-Breton
Marie Destrée-Danse
Margaret Isabel Dicksee
Agnese Dolci
Angèle Dubos
Victoria Dubourg
Clémentine-Hélène Dufau
Mary Elizabeth Duffield-Rosenberg
Maud Earl
Marie Ellenrieder
Alix-Louise Enault
Alice Maud Fanner
Catherine Maria Fanshawe
Jeanne Fichel
Rosalie Filleul
Fanny Fleury
Julia Bracewell Folkard
Lavinia Fontana
Elizabeth Adela Forbes
Eleanor Fortescue-Brickdale
Consuélo Fould
Empress Frederick of Germany
Elizabeth Jane Gardner
Artemisia Gentileschi
Diana Ghisi
Ketty Gilsoul-Hoppe
Marie-Éléonore Godefroid
Eva Gonzalès
Maude Goodman
Mary L. Gow
Kate Greenaway
Rosina Mantovani Gutti
Gertrude Demain Hammond
Emily Hart
Hortense Haudebourt-Lescot
Alice Havers
Ivy Heitland
Catharina van Hemessen
Matilda Heming
Mrs. John Herford
Emma Herland
E. Baily Hilda
Dora Hitz
A. M. Hobson
Adrienne van Hogendorp-s' Jacob
Lady Holroyd
Amelia Hotham
M. J. A. Houdon
Joséphine Houssaye
Barbara Elisabeth van Houten
Sina Mesdag van Houten
Julia Beatrice How
Mary Young Hunter
Helen Hyde
Katarina Ivanović
Infanta María de la Paz of Spain
Olga Jančić
Blanche Jenkins
Marie Jensen
Olga Jevrić
Louisa Jopling
Ljubinka Jovanović
Mina Karadžić
Angelica Kauffman
Lucy E. Kemp-Welch
Jessie M. King
Elisa Koch
Käthe Kollwitz
Adélaïde Labille-Guiard
Ethel Larcombe
Hermine Laucota
Madame Le Roy
Louise-Émilie Leleux-Giraud
Judith Leyster
Barbara Longhi
Princess Louise, Duchess of Argyll
Marie Seymour Lucas
Marie Lucas Robiquet
Vilma Lwoff-Parlaghy
Ann Macbeth
Biddie Macdonald
Jessie Macgregor
Violet Manners, Duchess of Rutland
E. Marcotte
Ana Marinković
Madeline Marrable
Edith Martineau
Caroline de Maupeou
Constance Mayer
Anne Mee
Margaret Meen
Maria S. Merian
Anna Lea Merritt
Georgette Meunier
Eulalie Morin
Berthe Morisot
Mary Moser
Marie Nicolas
Beatrice Offor
Adeline Oppenheim Guimard
Blanche Paymal-Amouroux
Marie Petiet
Nadežda Petrović
Zora Petrović
Constance Phillott
Maria Katharina Prestel
Henrietta Rae
Suor Barbara Ragnoni
Catharine Read
Marie Magdeleine Real del Sarte
Flora Macdonald Reid
Maria G. Silva Reis
Mrs. J. Robertson
Suze Robertson
Ottilie Roederstein
Juana Romani
Adèle Romany
Jeanne Rongier
Henriëtte Ronner-Knip
Baroness Lambert de Rothschild
Sophie Rude
Rachel Ruysch
Eugénie Salanson
Adelaïde Salles-Wagner
Amy Sawyer
Helene Schjerfbeck
Félicie Schneider
Anna Maria Schurman
Thérèse Schwartze
Doña Stuart Sindici
Elisabetta Sirani
Sienese Nun Sister A
Sienese Nun Sister B
Minnie Smythe
Élisabeth Sonrel
Lavinia, Countess Spencer
M. E. Edwards Staples
Louisa Starr
Marianne Stokes
Elizabeth Strong
Mary Ann Rankin (Mrs. J. M. Swan)
Annie Louise Swynnerton
E. De Tavernier
Elizabeth Upton, Baroness Templetown
Ellen Thesleff
Elizabeth Thompson
Maria Tibaldi m. Subleyras
Frédérique Vallet-Bisson
Caroline de Valory
Mlle. de Vanteuil
Elisabeth Vigée-Lebrun
Caterina Vigri
Vukosava Velimirović
Ana Vidjen
Draginja Vlasic
Beta Vukanović
Louisa Lady Waterford
Hermine Waternau
Caroline Watson
Cecilia Wentworth
E. Wesmael
Florence White
Maria Wiik
Julie Wolfthorn
Juliette Wytsman
Annie Marie Youngman
Jenny Zillhardt

References

Lists of painters
1905 non-fiction books
Lists of women artists
Biographical dictionaries of women
Books about women
Women painters
Books about artists
1905 in art